Podokoyo is a village in Tosari district, Pasuruan Regency in East Java province, Indonesia. Its population is 1804.

Climate
Podokoyo has a cold subtropical highland climate (Cwb) with heavy to very heavy rain in summer and light to moderate rainfall in winter. Being one of the coldest settlements in Java, its average temperature profile is identical to Skopje, North Macedonia as it contains strong oceanic characteristics.

References

 Populated places in East Java